David Daniel Norman Jr. (born May 31, 1998) is a Canadian professional soccer player who most recently played as a midfielder for Cavalry FC.

Club career

Whitecaps FC 2 
Norman Jr. played one year of college soccer at Oregon State University in 2016, before signing his first professional contract with Whitecaps FC 2 on January 19, 2017. In May 2017, Norman Jr. was named to the Whitecaps roster for the 2017 Canadian Championship on a short-term contract. Norman Jr. would be named the player of the year for Whitecaps FC 2 upon conclusion of the 2017 season. Norman Jr. would spend one season with Whitecaps FC 2 before the club ceased operations after the 2017 season.

Vancouver Whitecaps FC
In December 2017, Norman Jr. signed an MLS contract with Vancouver Whitecaps FC for the 2018 season, with options for the 2019, 2020 and 2021 seasons.

Loan to Queen of the South
In September 2018, Norman Jr. was loaned to Scottish Championship club Queen of the South. On October 20, 2018, Norman Jr. had his first league start for the Doonhamers at East End Park versus Dunfermline Athletic in a 1–0 win. In total he played 12 first team QoS games in his loan spell comprising 1 Challenge Cup game, 10 league games and 1 Scottish Cup game. Norman departed after the league match at Palmerston versus Dunfermline on December 22, 2018.

Loan to Pacific FC
On September 3, 2019, Norman was loaned to Canadian Premier League side Pacific FC until the end of the season. He made his debut as a starter the following day in a 1–1 draw against Forge FC.

Inter Miami
On September 3, 2019, after only one appearance for the Whitecaps, Norman was traded to expansion side Inter Miami in exchange for a conditional pick in the 2022 MLS SuperDraft, effective January 2020.

Miami opted to decline his contract option following the 2020 season.

Cavalry FC
On March 2, 2021, Norman returned to Canada, signing a multi-year deal with Canadian Premier League side Cavalry FC. In January 2022, it was announced Norman would return for the 2022 season. Cavalry would announce that Norman would leave the club upon completion of the 2022 season.

International career
In May 2018, Norman Jr. was named to Canada's under-21 squad for the 2018 Toulon Tournament. He was named to the Canadian U-23 provisional roster for the 2020 CONCACAF Men's Olympic Qualifying Championship on February 26, 2020, and was named to the final squad on March 10, 2021.

Personal life
Norman Jr. is the son of Scottish-born former Canada national team soccer player David Norman. Norman Jr. holds citizenship in both Canada and the United Kingdom.

References

External links
 David Norman Jr. at Vancouver Whitecaps FC
 
 
 
 

1998 births
Living people
Association football midfielders
Canadian soccer players
Soccer people from British Columbia
People from Coquitlam
Sportspeople from New Westminster
Canadian people of Scottish descent
Canadian expatriate soccer players
Expatriate footballers in Germany
Canadian expatriate sportspeople in Germany
Expatriate soccer players in the United States
Canadian expatriate sportspeople in the United States
Expatriate footballers in Scotland
Canadian expatriate sportspeople in Scotland
Vancouver Whitecaps FC players
1. FSV Mainz 05 players
Oregon State Beavers men's soccer players
Whitecaps FC 2 players
Queen of the South F.C. players
Pacific FC players
Inter Miami CF players
Cavalry FC players
USL Championship players
Scottish Professional Football League players
Canadian Premier League players
Homegrown Players (MLS)